Staraya Belitsa is a rural locality and the administrative center of Starobelitsky Selsoviet Rural Settlement, Konyshyovsky District, Kursk Oblast, Russia. Population:

Geography 
The village is located on the Belichka River (a left tributary of the Svapa River), 57 km from the Russia–Ukraine border, 74 km north-west of Kursk, 17.5 km north-west of the district center – the urban-type settlement Konyshyovka.

 Climate
Staraya Belitsa has a warm-summer humid continental climate (Dfb in the Köppen climate classification).

Transport 

The rural locality is situated 79 km from Kursk Vostochny Airport, 177 km from Belgorod International Airport and 278 km from Voronezh Peter the Great Airport.

References

Notes

Sources

Rural localities in Konyshyovsky District
Dmitriyevsky Uyezd